California's 33rd district may refer to:

 California's 33rd congressional district
 California's 33rd State Assembly district
 California's 33rd State Senate district